The 2005 Thailand Open was a tennis tournament played on indoor hard courts. It was the 3rd edition of the Thailand Open, and was part of the International Series of the 2005 ATP Tour. It took place at the Impact Arena in Bangkok, Thailand, from September 26 through October 2, 2005.

Roger Federer won in the final 6–3, 7–5 against Andy Murray. He did not lose a single set in the entire tournament. By reaching the final, Murray entered the ATP's Top 100 for the first time.

Seeds

Draw

Finals

Top half

Bottom half

Qualifying

References

Singles
Thailand Open - Singles
 in Thai tennis